Sanvitale is an Italian surname. It may refer to:

People 
 Antonio Francesco Sanvitale (1660–1714), Italian Roman Catholic cardinal 
 Federico Sanvitale (1704–1761), Italian mathematician and Jesuit
 Francesca Sanvitale (1928–2011), Italian novelist and journalist
 Galeazzo Sanvitale (died 1622), Italian Roman Catholic Archbishop of Bari-Canosa (1604-06)
 Gian Galeazzo Sanvitale (1496–1550), Italian condottiero, also known as Galeazzo I Sanvitale
 Portrait of Galeazzo Sanvitale (1524), a painting of the condottiero Gian Galeazzo Sanvitale
 Leonora Sanvitale (c. 1558–1582), Italian noblewoman and singer at the Este court at Ferrara
 Patrizia Sanvitale (born 1951), Italian journalist, author, blogger and sociologist

Other 
 Palazzo Sanvitale, located in central Parma, region of Emilia-Romagna, northern Italy
 Rocca Sanvitale, a fortress residence in the centre of Fontanellato, Province of Parma
 Sanvitale conspiracy, a plot to assassinate Ranuccio I Farnese, Duke of Parma and Piacenza